LMDP may refer to:

 Langholm Moor Demonstration Project
 La Mexicaine de Perforation